The waist is the part of the abdomen between the rib cage and hips. On people with slim bodies, the waist is the narrowest part of the torso.

Waistline refers to the horizontal line where the waist is narrowest, or to the general appearance of the waist.

Structure
Because of this and because the waist is often synonymous with the stomach, one can become confused as to the exact location of the waist. Another confusing factor is that the waistline differs on different people. A study showed that self-reported measurements, as opposed to measurement done by a technician, underestimated waist circumference and this underestimation increased with increased body size. In the study, waist circumference measured at the level of the umbilicus was larger than that measured at the natural waist. 

To locate the natural waistline, one need simply stand upright and then tilt over to the side, keeping the legs and hips straight. Where the torso creases is the natural waistline.

Waist measurement
The waist is usually measured at the smallest circumference of the natural waist, usually just above the belly button. Where the waist is convex rather than concave, as in pregnancy and obesity, the waist may be measured at a vertical level 1 inch above the navel.<ref
  name="Brown">
</ref>

Strictly, the waist circumference is measured at a level midway between the lowest palpable rib and the iliac crest, respectively typically 60% and 64% of total height.<ref
  name= "(Gill & Parker, 2014)"/>  It can be predicted as 72% of the neck height;<ref
  name= "(Gill & Parker, 2014)"/> an alternative approximation, very relevant in anthropometry, is Small of the Back (SOB) + 2cm.<ref
  name= "(Gill & Parker, 2014)">
</ref> 

Variables such as posture significantly influence the measurement of the waist, and therefore any measurements for a group need to maintain a constant posture between the subjects.

Waist size (waist circumference) is an indicator of abdominal obesity. Excess abdominal fat is a risk factor for developing heart disease and other obesity related diseases. A study published in the European Heart Journal in April 2007 showed that waist circumference and waist–hip ratio (defined as waist circumference divided by hip circumference) were predictors of cardiovascular events. Further, whether waist circumference or body mass index (BMI) is a better predictor of adverse health outcomes is debatable. For example, those who lift weights may have high BMI but are at relatively low risk for cardiovascular consequences. For these people, waist circumference may be a better indicator of overall health. Some research suggests waist circumference can be predicted from brain function, therefore capturing the neurobehavioral pathophysiology of obesity.

Waist–hip ratio

Waist–hip ratio is the ratio of the circumference of the waist to that of the hips. It measures the proportion by which fat is distributed around the torso. Waist–hip ratios of 0.7 for women and 0.9 for men have been shown to correlate strongly with general health and fertility. This shape is compared to the hourglass shape of women.

Society and culture

Fashion
In modern clothing, the region referred to as the waist is considerably below the waist as defined anatomically. 
With the advent of pants and skirts that do not require support from above, the clothing waist moved down to a position where the body starts to expand to form the buttocks and a support is therefore available. However, the waist region remains a highly important measurement and anthropometric landmark in garment construction.

Jewellery, such as a belly chain, may be worn around either the clothing or anatomical waist.

Waist reduction and training
Waist reduction or waist training refer to the act of wearing a corset or other constricting garment to reduce or alter the waistline.  The four floating ribs may be permanently compressed or moved by such garments.  A girdle may also be used to alter the appearance of the waist.

Waist reduction may be used simply to reduce the width of the waist.  This change can be permanent or temporary.

Waist training may be used to achieve a certain permanent waist shape, such as a pipe-stem waist.

History

Etymology
Definition: "middle part of the body," also "part of a garment fitted for the waist, portion of a garment that covers the waist" (but, due to fashion styles, often above or below it), probably from Old English  "growth," hence, "where the body grows," from Proto-Germanic *wahs-tu- (cognates: Old English , Old Norse , Swedish , Old High German  "growth, increase," Gothic  "stature," Old English  "to grow".

See also

 Abdominal obesity
 Alvinolagnia
 Belly dance
 Body modification
 Human body
 Midriff
 Navel
 Rib removal
 Waist–hip ratio
 Waist-to-height ratio
 :Category:Corsetry
 Hourglass corset
 Tightlacing
 Training corset
 Waist cincher
 Waistcoat

References

External links
 
Measured average height, weight, and waist circumference for adults ages 20 years and over (U.S.)

Abdomen
Secondary sexual characteristics